Euthalia agnis  is a butterfly of the family Nymphalidae (Limenitidinae). It is found in the Indomalayan realm.<ref>[http://ftp.funet.fi/pub/sci/bio/life/insecta/lepidoptera/ditrysia/papilionoidea/nymphalidae/limenitidinae/euthalia/ " Euthalia  " Hübner, [1819"] at Markku Savela's Lepidoptera and Some Other Life Forms</ref>

SubspeciesE. a. agnis JavaE. a. modesta  Fruhstorfer, 1906  SumatraE. a. hiyamai''  Yokochi & Matsuda, 1999  Malaya

References

Butterflies described in 1862
agnis
Taxa named by Samuel Constantinus Snellen van Vollenhoven